31 canciones de amor y una canción de Guaripolo (lit: 31 love songs and one Guaripolo song) is the second studio album by 31 Minutos. It was released in Chile on July 28, 2004 under the La Oreja Records label. It was reissued in 2007 by EMI in Mexico, and in again in Chile in 2012 by Feria Music.

It has a cumbia version of the theme Yo nunca vi televisión, performed by La sonora de Tommy Rey. Following the same pattern as the previous album, the album surpassed the sale of 20,000 copies in less than a month.

Launch and reception 
It was launched on the Paseo Ahumada on July 31, 2004, attracting more than a thousand people. In addition, it was released on the same date as the last episode of the second season, Fiesta en la casa de Juanín. 31 canciones de amor y una canción de Guaripolo, whose title refers to the book Twenty Love Poems and a Song of Despair (by Pablo Neruda), included a sticker of the character on its cover and 3 music video. In less than 2 weeks of debuting on the market, it quickly sold out at record stores.

Tracklist

References 

Soundtracks by Chilean artists
2004 soundtrack albums
Television soundtracks
Spanish-language soundtracks